Sir William Allen Daley (19 February 1887 - February 1969) was a British medical officer of health at the time of the formation of the UK's National Health Service (NHS).

References 

1887 births
1960 deaths
20th-century British medical doctors
British public health doctors
People from Liverpool